Beata Elżbieta Maksymow-Wendt (born 27 July 1967) is a Polish judoka. She competed at the 1992, 1996 and the 2000 Summer Olympics.

References

External links
 

1967 births
Living people
Polish female judoka
Olympic judoka of Poland
Judoka at the 1992 Summer Olympics
Judoka at the 1996 Summer Olympics
Judoka at the 2000 Summer Olympics
People from Czeladź
20th-century Polish women